The 333d Special Operations Wing is an inactive United States Air Force unit.  It was active from July 1968 through March 1970 at Pleiku Air Base, South Vietnam.  In 1985, the wing was consolidated with the 333d Bombardment Group as the 333d Special Operations Wing.

History

World War II

Heavy bomber training unit
The 333d Bombardment Group, a Boeing B-17 Flying Fortress Operational Training Unit (OTU) assigned to Second Air Force, was established at Topeka Army Air Base, Kansas in July 1942.  The 333d's original components were the 466th, 467th, 468th and 469th Bombardment Squadrons.  The squadrons were all initially formed at Salt Lake City Army Air Base, and did not join group headquarters at Topeka until late August.

The OTU program involved the use of an oversized parent unit to provide cadres  to "satellite groups".  In February 1943 it moved to Dalhart Army Air Field, Texas, and shifted its mission to become a Replacement Training Unit (RTU).  RTUs were also oversized units, but trained individual pilots or aircrews for shipment to theaters of operation.  However, the Army Air Forces found that standard military units like the 333d, based on relatively inflexible tables of organization, were not proving well adapted to the training mission.  Accordingly a more functional system was adopted in which each base was organized into a separate numbered unit. As a result, the group was inactivated and training activities at Dalhart were assumed by the 232d (bomber) and 268th (fighter) AAF Base Units.

Very heavy bomber operations

Dalhart became a center for organizing Boeing B-29 Superfortress very heavy bombardment groups and the 333d was again activated there in July 1944.  However, its original squadrons were not activated along with it.  Instead, the 435th, 460th, and 507th Bombardment Squadrons were assigned.  These three squadrons had previously been the "fourth" (highest numbered) squadrons in groups that also flew B-29s.  The three squadrons had been inactivated in May 1944, when B-29 groups were reorganized to have three, rather than four squadrons.  The 435th had seen combat in the Southwest Pacific Theater early in the war.

In January 1945 the group moved to Great Bend Army Air Field, Kansas, where it continued its training until June 1945.  The group deployed to Okinawa as part of Eighth Air Force in the Pacific Theater. It arrived in Okinawa, but the end of the war with the defeat of Japan led to a drawdown of Eighth Air Force and the group never engaged in combat. The group helped evacuate prisoners of war from Japan to airfields in the Philippines. The unit was inactivated on Okinawa on 28 May 1946.

Vietnam War
The 633d Combat Support Group had provided support for Air Force units at Pleiku Air Base, South Vietnam since the spring of 1966.  In February 1968, the 6th Air Commando Squadron, flying Douglas A-1 Skyraiders, moved to Pleiku from England Air Force Base, Louisiana and was assigned to the 14th Air Commando Wing, which was located at Nha Trang Air Base.  The 633d Special Operations Wing was activated in July 1968 to act as the headquarters for both units stationed at Pleiku.

The wing engaged in special operations combat, including close air support, air escort, day and night interdiction, and visual and photographic reconnaissance from its activation until November 1969.

In November 1969 its only operational squadron was inactivated in Operation Keystone Cardinal, the first reduction in United States Air Forces combat forces as ceilings on forces in South Vietnam were reduced and the United States began to withdraw.  Its Douglas A-1 Skyraiders were transferred to the 56th Special Operations Wing in Thailand.  The wing managed the reduction of United States forces at Pleiku until March 1970, when it was inactivated and transferred its remaining equipment and personnel to the 6254th Air Base Squadron.

Consolidation and redesignation
In July 1985, the wing was consolidated with the 333d Bombardment Group, a World War II unit that also served in the Pacific area.  The consolidated unit was designated the 333d Special Operations Wing, but has never been active under that designation.

Lineage
 333d Bombardment Group
 Constituted as the 333d Bombardment Group (Heavy) on 9 July 1942
 Activated on 15 July 1942
 Inactivated on 1 April 1944
 Redesignated 333d Bombardment Group, Very Heavy
 Activated on 7 July 1944
 Inactivated on 28 May 1946
 Consolidated with the 633d Special Operations Wing as the 333d Special Operations Wing on 31 July 1985

 333d Special Operations Wing
 Established as the 633d Special Operations Wing and activated on 9 July 1968 (not organized)
 Organized on 15 July 1968
 Inactivated on 15 March 1970
 Consolidated with the 333d Bombardment Group as the 333d Special Operations Wing on 31 July 1985

Assignments
 21st Bombardment Wing, 15 Jul 1942
 Probably II Bomber Command, 21 February 1943 – 1 April 1944
 Probably II Bomber Command, 7 July 1944
 316th Bombardment Wing (later 316th Composite Wing), by 31 August 1945 – 28 May 1946
 Pacific Air Forces, 9 July 1968 (not organized)
 Seventh Air Force, 15 July 1968 – 15 March 1970

Components
 Group
 633d Combat Support Group, 15 July 1968- 15 March 1970

 Squadrons
 6th Air Commando Squadron (later 6th Special Operations Squadron), 15 July 1968 – 15 November 1969
 466th Bombardment Squadron, 15 July 1942—1 April 1944
 467th Bombardment Squadron, 15 July 1942—1 April 1944
 468th Bombardment Squadron, 15 July 1942—1 April 1944
 469th Bombardment Squadron, 15 July 1942—1 April 1944
 435th Bombardment Squadron, 7 July 1944 – 28 May 1946
 460th Bombardment Squadron, 7 July 1944 – 28 May 1946
 507th Bombardment Squadron, 7 July 1944 – 28 May 1946
 633d Consolidated Aircraft Maintenance Squadron, 15 July 1968 – 15 March 1970

 Other
 31st Photo Laboratory, c. 7 July 1944 – c. 28 May 1946
 633d USAF infirmary, 15 July 1968 – 15 March 1970

Stations
 Topeka Army Air Base, Kansas, 15 July 1942
 Dalhart Army Air Field, Texas, 22 February 1943 – 1 April 1944
 Dalhart Army Air Field, Texas, 7 July 1944
 Great Bend Army Air Field, Kansas, 13 January – 18 June 1945
 Kadena Air Base, Okinawa 5 August 1945 – 28 May 1946
 Pleiku Air Base, South Vietnam, 9 July 1968 – 15 March 1970

Aircraft
 Boeing B-17 Flying Fortress, 1942-1944
 Boeing B-29 Superfortress, 1944-1946
 Douglas A-1 Skyraider, 1968-1969

Campaigns and awards

See also

 List of inactive AFCON wings of the United States Air Force
 List of A-1 Skyraider operators
 List of B-29 Superfortress operators
 B-17 Flying Fortress units of the United States Army Air Forces

References
 Notes

Bibliography

 
 
 
 
 
 

Pleiku
Military units and formations established in 1968
Special operations wings of the United States Air Force